Jace Lee Norman (born March 21, 2000) is an American actor. He starred as Henry Hart in the Nickelodeon television series Henry Danger from 2014 to 2020.

Early life
Norman was born in Corrales, New Mexico. He moved to Southern California when he was 8. He was bullied for being dyslexic during middle school. He has an older brother and an older sister.

Career
Norman started his acting career in 2012 with an appearance on Disney's television series Jessie. From 2014 to 2020, he played the lead role in Nickelodeon's sitcom Henry Danger. Norman has starred in the Nickelodeon Original Movies, Splitting Adam in 2015, and Rufus in 2016; a sequel to the latter, Rufus 2, aired on Nickelodeon in January 2017, with Norman reprising the starring role. He had his theatrical film debut as the lead voice role in the animated film Spark, released in April 2017. In 2019, he starred in the Nickelodeon Original Movie, Bixler High Private Eye, playing the lead role of Xander DeWitt. In 2017, 2018, 2019, and 2020, Norman won the Nickelodeon Kids' Choice Award for Favorite Male TV Star. He won his fifth Kids' Choice Award in a row for the same category in the 2021 Kids' Choice Awards. Since 2020, Norman has been a producer on the Nickelodeon series Danger Force,and has also appeared as a guest star in that series.  In January 2022, it was announced that Norman will reprise his role in a Henry Danger film set to be released on Paramount+.

Filmography

Awards and nominations

References

External links

 
 

2000 births
Living people
21st-century American male actors
American male child actors
American male film actors
American male television actors
Male actors from New Mexico
Participants in American reality television series
People from Corrales, New Mexico
Actors with dyslexia